The 2017–18 season was Burnley's 136th competitive season, their second consecutive in the Premier League and their 55th in top flight English football. Along with the Premier League, the club also competed in the FA Cup and EFL Cup.

The season covered the period from 1 July 2017 to 30 June 2018.

Match details

Premier League

League table

Results summary

Matches

FA Cup

EFL Cup

Transfers

In

 Brackets around club names denote the player's contract with that club had expired before he joined Burnley.

Loans in

Out

 Brackets around club names denote the player joined that club after his Burnley contract expired.

Loans out

Appearances and goals
Source:
Numbers in parentheses denote appearances as substitute.
Players with names struck through and marked  left the club during the playing season.
Players with names in italics and marked * were on loan from another club for the whole of their season with Burnley.
Players listed with no appearances have been in the matchday squad but only as unused substitutes.
Key to positions: GK – Goalkeeper; DF – Defender; MF – Midfielder; FW – Forward

See also
List of Burnley F.C. seasons

References

Burnley F.C. seasons
Burnley